Love Ke Liye Kuch Bhi Karega is a 2001 Indian Hindi-language crime comedy film directed by Eeshwar Nivas and produced by Ram Gopal Varma and Nitin Manmohan. The film stars Saif Ali Khan, Fardeen Khan, Sonali Bendre, Twinkle Khanna, Aftab Shivdasani and Johnny Lever in lead roles. The film is an official remake of the 1993 Telugu film Money. This film marked Twinkle Khanna's final acting performance, prior to her marriage and subsequent retirement from the industry. It was released on 29 June 2001 and unlike the original version, the Hindi remake received mixed reviews and eventually became a box-office bomb. The rights to this film are owned by Shah Rukh Khan's Red Chillies Entertainment and the film is said to be loosely based on the American black comedy Fargo.

Plot
A troubled young man, Prakash, is married to Sapna, the only daughter of a wealthy business tycoon Rajiv Chopra. Prakash is damaad (Son-in-law) of Rajiv Chopra. Rajiv Chopra totally hates Prakash and often troubles him. Prakash, who tires of being troubled by Chopra, then plans to have Sapna kidnapped to make Rajiv Chopra feel the way he does. He hires two broke strugglers, Rahul and Harry who are to be fake kidnappers and kidnap Sapna. Rahul is an unemployed graduate who is seeking employment and is in love with Anjali the daughter of his landlord Dakshina Murthi. Murthi makes a condition to let Anjali marry Rahul if he finds a job in one month and pays all his rents that are overdue. If not, he would make Anjali marry someone else who has a good job. This prompts hopeless and vulnerable Rahul and his roommate Harry to join the fake kidnapping scheme.

The plan succeeds, and Chopra is deceived. Rahul and Harry demand Rs.1 crores as ransom money and the fooled Chopra agrees to pay. As the ransom money has been paid, Rahul and Harry set Sapna free and leave her in a forest, which is also part of Prakash's plan. Prakash arrives at the forest to pick up Sapna, however he realizes that she has been kidnapped again but this time by real kidnappers. This crime caper soon turns into one hilarious joy ride!

Cast
 Fardeen Khan as Rahul Kapoor/Khalid Muhammad 
 Saif Ali Khan as Prakash Shastri
 Sonali Bendre as Sapna Chopra, Prakash's Wife 
 Twinkle Khanna as Anjali Murri, Rahul's Girlfriend 
 Dalip Tahil as Rajiv Chopra, Sapna's Father
 Aftab Shivdasani as Harilal "Harry" Chaturvedi/Sultan Ahmad
 Johnny Lever as Aslam Bhai
Anupam Shyam as Sardar
 Tanikella Bharani as Dakshina Murthy, Anjali's father
 Sudha as Rameshwari, Anjali's mother
 Snehal Dabi as Aaj Kapoor
 Sharat Saxena as Police Officer
 Shrivallabh Vyas as Police Commissioner

Soundtrack

Reviewing the music album for Rediff.com, Sukanya Verma wrote that "Aslam Bhai" song "manages to click" "despite the fact that it has absurd lines". Vishal Bhardwaj composed the songs whereas Abbas Tyrewala wrote them.

Reception
Sukanya Verma opined that the film was "mostly watchable for its bubbling enthusiasm and, of course, Aslambhai". Taran Adarsh of Bollywood Hungama found the film "engaging, but in parts". He was of the view that the film's comedy was similar to that seen in Basu Chatterjee's films and both the actresses; Khanna and Bendre lacked "enough scope" for acting. Amaresh Misra of Outlook stated that Khanna and Bendre had been "wasted" in the film, which lacked of "innovative screenplay".

References

External links
 

2000s buddy comedy films
2000s crime comedy films
2001 romantic comedy films
2001 films
2000s Hindi-language films
Indian buddy comedy films
Indian crime comedy films
Indian romantic comedy films
Hindi remakes of Telugu films
Films scored by Vishal Bhardwaj
Films directed by Eeshwar Nivas